Kaal Madhumas is a 2013 Bengali film. The film was directed by Prabir Roy and produced by Adwik Entertainments. The music of the film composed by Biplab Chakraborty. Kaal Madhumas had its all India Release on 13 September 2013. The film comprises 4 songs sung by Sreeradha Bandopadhay, Probal Mallick, Dr. Sandip Chakraborty and Reshmi Chakraborty. Kaal Madhumas has been voted the top internet publicized film. Kaal Madhumas was also the first Bengali Film to release its Android and IOS mobile app for the film where the cast and crew could directly interact with the audience in an interactive section of the app. Television actor Sudip Sarkar makes his debut in this film.

Plot 
The story of the film revolves around a Bengali homemaker Swati (Rimjhim Gupta) and her abusive advocate husband Kunal (Arindam Sil). Swati elopes with her neighbour Sarit (Sudip Sarkar) and embark on a journey of uncertainty. Swati meets her college friend Keya (Ranjini Chatterjee) and her husband Aninda (Saptarshi Ray) and spends some unforgettable days of their life in the hills while their prolonged honeymoon continues.

Cast 
Sudip Sarkar
Rimjhim Gupta
Saptarshi Ray
Ranjini Chatterjee
Arindam Sil
Debraj Roy
Neil Roy

References

External links
 
 

Bengali-language Indian films
2010s Bengali-language films
2013 films